Freethorpe is a village and civil parish in the English of Norfolk.

History
The origin of Freethorpe's name is uncertain. It either derives from the Old Norse for Fraethi's settlement or an amalgamation of the Old Norse and Old English for a settlement offering refuge or safety.

In the Domesday Book, Freethorpe is listed as a settlement of 20 households in the hundred of Blofield. In 1086, the village was divided between the East Anglia estates of King William I, William de Beaufeu and Rabel the engineer.

Several Nineteenth Century almshouses are located within the village, which were built in 1871 by Richard Henry and Harriet Vade Walpole to care for local widows.

During the First World War, the village was home to a Royal Flying Corps airfield between 1916 and 1918. During the Second World War, the airfield was passed on to the Royal Observer Corps who operated the site until the mid-Twentieth Century. In addition, an eastern part of the parish was designated as a Starfish site during the Second World War to draw Luftwaffe attention away from Norwich and Great Yarmouth.

Geography
According to the 2011 Census, Freethorpe has a population of 995 residents living in 405 households.

Freethorpe falls within the constituency of Broadland and is represented at Parliament by Jerome Mayhew MP of the Conservative Party. For the purposes of local government, the parish falls within the district of Broadland.

All Saints' Church
Freethorpe's parish church is one of Norfolk's remaining 124 round-tower churches, with the tower dating from the Twelfth Century and the remainder of the church dating from the Thirteenth Century. The church was restored in the Nineteenth Century by Anthony Salvin at the behest of Richard Henry Vade Walpole, Lord of the Manor of Freethorpe. The stained-glass inside the church was installed by Thomas Willement and Clayton and Bell and largely glorify the Walpole family.

Freethorpe also has a Methodist Chapel that holds regular church services and seats up to 150 people.

Amenities
The majority of local children attend Freethorpe Community Primary School, which was rated as 'Good' by Ofsted in 2016 which was subsequently upheld in 2019.

War Memorial
Freethorpe's war memorial takes the form of a square pillar, made from Granite, topped with a carved urn, located in the cemetery of Freethorpe's Methodist Church. The memorial lists the following names for the First World War:

 Cpl. John H. Alexander (1896-1918), 9th Bn., Royal Norfolk Regiment
 Cpl. Frank Lake (1891-1916), 1st Bn., Duke of Cornwall's Light Infantry
 L-Cpl. Frederick Carr (1878-1916), 8th Bn., Royal Norfolk Regt.
 Pvt. Alfred R. Brock (d.1918), 1st Depot, Royal Army Service Corps
 Pvt. George Meal (d.1916), 13th Bn., Essex Regiment
 Pvt. Wilfred Cater (1899-1918), 6th Coy., Machine Gun Corps
 Pvt. Mark Shorten (d.1916), 110th Coy., Machine Gun Corps
 Pvt. Robert J. Lake (1893-1916), 1st Bn., Royal Norfolk Regt.
 Pvt. George Ward (d.1914), 1st Bn., Royal Regiment Regt.
 Pvt. Thomas F. Dawson (d.1916), 8th Bn., Royal Norfolk Regt.
 Pvt. D. Hugh Burton (1895-1916), 9th Bn., Royal Norfolk Regt.
 Pvt. Basil Lake (1899-1918), Sussex Yeomanry
 Skpr. Samuel C. Falgate (1868-1916), H.M. Drifter Hilary II
 Walter Lake

And, the following for the Second World War:
 P/O. William R. Turner (1907-1942), H.M. Submarine Upholder
 Pvt. Alec G. Nicholls (1919-1944), 1st Bn., Royal Norfolk Regt.

References

External links

All Saints on the European Round Tower Churches Website

Villages in Norfolk
Civil parishes in Norfolk
Broadland